José Guillermo Mora Campos (born 2 June 1992) is a Costa Rican international footballer who plays for San Carlos, as a midfielder.

Career
Born in Nicoya, Mora has played club football for Carmelita, Guanacasteca, Jicaral and Municipal Grecia.

He made his international debut for Costa Rica in 2019.

References

External links

1992 births
Living people
Costa Rican footballers
Costa Rica international footballers
Liga FPD players
A.D. Carmelita footballers
Brujas FC players
A.D.R. Jicaral players
Municipal Grecia players
C.S. Herediano footballers
Association football midfielders
A.D. San Carlos footballers